Andriej Kapaś (born 11 August 1989) is a Polish professional tennis player. He competes mainly on the ATP Challenger Tour and ITF Futures, both in singles and doubles. He reached his highest ATP singles ranking, No. 323, and his highest ATP doubles ranking, No. 163, on 6 April 2015.

Career finals

Singles: 2 (1 title, 1 runners-up)

Doubles: 3 (1 title, 2 runners-up)

References

External links
 
 

1989 births
Living people
Polish male tennis players
Place of birth missing (living people)
21st-century Polish people